The Municipality of Dundas was a local government area in the North-western region of Sydney, New South Wales, Australia. Initially proclaimed as the "Borough of Dundas" on 23 March 1889, the southern part of the municipality seceded in June 1891 as the Municipal District of Ermington and Rydalmere. From 1891, the municipality included the modern suburbs of Dundas, Dundas Valley and parts of Ermington, Epping, Eastwood, Melrose Park, Oatlands and Carlingford. From 1 January 1949, the council was amalgamated into the City of Parramatta, with the passing of the Local Government (Areas) Act 1948.

Council history

Early years and development
The area comprising the Dundas municipality was first incorporated on 23 March 1889, when the "Borough of Dundas" was proclaimed in the lands east of the Town of Parramatta by the Governor of New South Wales, Lord Carrington.

The first council, comprising nine Aldermen elected at-large, was elected on 18 May 1889, conducted by Walter Monckton, Returning Officer. The council first met at Rydalmere Hall, Rydalmere, on 22 May 1889 with James Fulford elected the first mayor. William De Burgh Hocter, former town clerk of The Glebe, was appointed the first Town Clerk in June 1889.

Following a petition, the borough was divided into three wards, North Ward, Central Ward and South Ward, on 30 December 1889.

Separation of Ermington-Rydalmere
On 13 February 1891, 94 residents of the South Ward submitted a petition to the NSW Government requesting the creation of a separate municipality divided into two wards. This petition was subsequently accepted and the "Municipal District of Ermington and Rydalmere" was proclaimed on 18 June 1891. The separation also required the reconstitution of Dundas, which was proclaimed as (East Ward, West Ward; six aldermen) on the same day.

On the separation, The Cumberland Argus and Fruitgrowers' Advocate, which had opposed the separation, noted: "There will be a good deal of weeping and wailing at Dundas in consequence; but, although we fought tooth and nail against the petitioners, we hope now to see the hatchet buried. Both municipalities must work together for their own good".

The council wards were rearranged into three wards on 6 June 1902, with Central Ward adding three aldermen to the number from February 1903. From 28 December 1906, following the passing of the Local Government Act, 1906, the council was renamed as the "Municipality of Dundas".

Council seat

Later history
By the end of the Second World War, the NSW Government had realised that its ideas of infrastructure expansion could not be effected by the present system of the patchwork of small municipal councils across Sydney and the Minister for Local Government, Joseph Cahill, initiated the 1945–46 Clancy Royal Commission on Local Government Boundaries, to consider these changes. The Dundas and Ermington-Rydalmere municipalities recognised this pressure by initiated procedures to amalgamate once more and Ermington-Rydalmere appointed A. T. Kay, Town Clerk of Dundas, as their acting town clerk in anticipation of this.

The NSW Government however passed a bill following the recommendations of the Royal Commission in 1948 that abolished a significant number of Sydney metropolitan councils. Pre-empting the actions of Dundas and Ermington-Rydalmere, under the Local Government (Areas) Act 1948 (effective 1 January 1949), both councils merged with the City of Parramatta to form the a new City of Parramatta.

The Dundas municipality became "Dundas Ward", returning four aldermen. Kay became the new Parramatta Town Clerk, while Eric Arthur Mobbs, mayor of Dundas from 1944, became the first mayor of the expanded City of Parramatta. In 1950 a reorganisation of Parramatta's wards resulted in Ermington-Rydalmere ward being absorbed into the Dundas Ward, adding two aldermen.

Mayors

Town Clerks

References

Further reading

Dundas
Dundas
Dundas
Dundas